Eleutheroschizonidae is a family of parasites in the order Protococcidiorida. There are three genera currently recognised in this family. All species in this family infect annelids.

The family was created in 1936 by Chatton and Villeneuve.

The type species is Eleutheroschizon duboscqi Brasil 1906.

Description

References

Conoidasida
Apicomplexa families